"All You Really Wanna Do" is a song recorded by Canadian country music artist Michelle Wright. It was released in April 1991 as the fourth single from her second studio album, Michelle Wright. It peaked at number 9 on the RPM Country Tracks chart in August 1991.

Chart performance

Year-end charts

References

1990 songs
1991 singles
Michelle Wright songs
Arista Nashville singles
Songs written by Steve Bogard
Songs written by Rick Giles